More than Friends may refer to:

"More than Friends" (Inna song), 2013
"More than Friends" (James Hype song), 2017
"More than Friends" (Jason Mraz song), 2018
"More than Friends", a 2009 song by Mario
"More than Friends", a 2008 song by Estelle
"More than Friends", a 2014 song by Victoria Duffield
More Than Friends (album), a 1988 album by Jonathan Butler
More Than Friends, a 2020 South Korean television series